Dicranoses is a genus of moth in the family Cecidosidae. It contains the single species Dicranoses capsulifex.

References

Cecidosidae
Adeloidea genera
Monotypic moth genera